is a Japanese manga series written and illustrated by Kenichi Muraeda. It was serialized in Shogakukan's Weekly Shōnen Sunday from January 1992 to October 1998.

Plot
A soccer loving boy, Takasugi Kazuya, dreams of playing soccer with his Japan League star father at National Yoyogi Stadium. The story follows Kazuya's life as he travels to Argentina, plays for Yamaki, and goes to the 1998 World Cup in France.

Manga
Our Field of Dreams is written and illustrated by Kenichi Muraeda. It began in the combined 1992 3rd–4th issue of Shogakukan's Weekly Shōnen Sunday on January 11, 1992, and finished in the 1998 45th issue on October 21, 1998. Its chapters were collected in Japan thirty-four tankōbon volumes published by Shogakukan, released from July 17, 1992, to January 18, 1999. It was re-published in nineteen bunkoban volumes from August 12, 2005, to February 15, 2007.

Volume list

References

External links
 Official website at Web Sunday 
 Official Shogakukan manga web site 

Association football in anime and manga
Shōnen manga
Shogakukan manga